The Wisk Cora is an American autonomous personal air vehicle prototype previously developed by the Kitty Hawk Corporation, and subsequently by Wisk Aero.

History 

The Kitty Hawk Corporation first presented the Cora publicly in March 2018. The company is named after the location near which the Wright brothers' first powered flight took place. The Cora is a two-seater development of the Zee Aero Z-P2. The individual approvals of the Cora by the Federal Aviation Administration (FAA) were done under the name Zee Aero Mule SPA, then as Kitty Hawk Mule SPA. The development, testing and operation takes place in collaboration with the New Zealand subsidiary Zephyr Airworks, founded by Kitty Hawk in December 2016. 

In June 2019 the Kitty Hawk Corporation and Boeing agreed to collaborate in the field of urban air mobility. For this purpose, a company called Wisk Aero LLC was founded on December 2, 2019. Zephyr Airworks became Wisk New Zealand. After approval by the government, a trial operation with the Cora took place in New Zealand in February 2020. With the termination of BoeingNeXT operations in mid-2020, some doubt existed on the continued relationship between Wisk and Boeing.

By 2021 Zephyr Airworks planned to set up an air taxi service in New Zealand. It is planned that the aircraft will only be used for the flight service planned in cooperation with Air New Zealand. 

In January 2022, Wisk Aero announced a $450 million investment by Boeing, to further develop the Wisk Cora pilot-less flying taxis.

Design

In accordance with the design, the aircraft is to be regarded as a gyrodyne. It has 12 electric motors for hovering at two fixed wings, each with 6 propellers (with near vertical axis), three in front of the wing and three behind. For horizontal flight there is a separately driven pressure propeller. An overall rescue system is provided for emergencies. The first flight was on March 13, 2018 in Mountain View, California.

Specifications

See also
 Air taxi

References

External links 
 WISK Cora
 Wisk (Kitty Hawk) Cora on Electric VTOL News

2010s United States experimental aircraft
Proposed aircraft of the United States
Electric aircraft
Boeing aircraft
Aircraft first flown in 2018
Urban air mobility
EVTOL aircraft